The Stone Pony is a New Jersey music venue in Asbury Park, New Jersey known for launching the careers of many New Jersey music legends, including Bruce Springsteen, Jon Bon Jovi, and Southside Johnny and the Asbury Jukes. The club opened in  1973.

History

Prior to becoming a music venue, the building housed a restaurant named Mrs. Jay's, later named Mrs. Jay's Beer Garden, that was frequented by a polyglot community of tourists, high school and college students, and bikers. During the mid-1960s, Mrs. Jay's management began to allow bands to perform. After the restaurant and beer garden went out of business in 1968, allegedly over a waitress wearing a see-through blouse, Mrs. Jay's moved two doors south and reopened a short time thereafter. The second incarnation of Mrs. Jays became a notorious biker hangout in its later days before being demolished in the late 1980s. Harley-Davidsons lined entire blocks after cruising the circuit. The building that originally housed Mrs. Jay's reopened in Fall 1973 as The Stone Pony.

Since The Stone Pony opened in 1973, many of the world's most popular musical artists have played on its stage. In 1991, The Stone Pony had to file for bankruptcy because of a series of drunk driving lawsuits. However, the nightclub reopened in 1992. Because of its importance to the music world, there was a national outcry when there was talk of closing the Pony during the late 1990s. The Stone Pony was repeatedly opened and closed as developers targeted Asbury Park through the beginning of the new millennium, and musicians and patrons organized and rallied in support of The Stone Pony.

The annual Asbury Park Music Awards ceremony, founded in 1993 as "The Golden T-Bird Awards" and renamed "The Asbury Park Music Awards" in 1995, is usually held at The Stone Pony. The awards recognize excellence in the region's music community. The format for the ceremony is similar to that of the Grammy Awards. It features the presentation of awards between performances of live, original music and poetry. The event is jointly sponsored by The Stone Pony, The Saint, WBJB-FM, and The Aquarian.

The club was renovated in 2000, preserving the character associated with its early years while adding a permanent exhibition of art and artifacts from the history of the city and the venue itself. State-of-the-art lighting and sound equipment were installed, and outside, facing the Atlantic Ocean, The Stone Pony Landing area was redone with a beach motif, tenting and food facility. Fans and artists continued to support the Pony, and the Asbury Park Music Awards returned to the Stone Pony. 

Eventually, the music community prevailed, and a vibrant live music scene reemerged and crowds returned. "A visit to The Stone Pony has been considered a pilgrimage to rock 'n' roll fans around the world. "It is a place that is important not just to us, but to the world," New Jersey Governor Christine Todd Whitman said as she officially reopened the club on Memorial Day weekend 2000.

Asbury Park community support
Before it reopened in 2000, The Stone Pony made a commitment to become involved in the Asbury Park community. The club and the city co-sponsored a weekend-long Asbury Park Festival along the oceanfront. The festival was free to the public and featured local arts and crafts vendors as well as live music both inside and outside the club. The U.S. Postal Service created a special cancellation for the event, and hundreds of people lined up to have envelopes stamped for the occasion. The club was open in the evening, and part of the proceeds was donated to the Stephen Crane House on Fourth Avenue in the city, where the author of The Red Badge of Courage lived during much of his short life.

The Stone Pony has hosted a number of events supporting Asbury Park-area community groups and charities. Proceeds from a concert entitled "Remembering Harry Chapin" benefited a charity that fights world hunger, and the club has been designated as an official drop-off point for the Food Banks of Monmouth and Ocean Counties. The club held a fundraising event for the Jersey Shore Jazz and Blues Foundation, the Acoustic Musicians Guild, sponsored a concert at which Bruce Springsteen appeared in support of the Parkinson's Disease Foundation, and held a benefit event for the family of a young man who lost his life in a motorcycle accident.

The club partnered with the community in offering the first Asbury Park showing of a photography exhibit spotlighting the city by students of the Rugby School at Woodfield for learning disabled and behaviorally challenged students. The Stone Pony's management also established "The Stone Pony Foundation" to promote music education at the elementary and high school levels. An amplifier was purchased for an aspiring teenage blues guitarist from the area, and the club was a sponsor for an event at another venue which benefited music and art education in Asbury Park schools.

References

External link
Official website

1974 establishments in New Jersey
Asbury Park, New Jersey
Buildings and structures in Monmouth County, New Jersey
Music venues in New Jersey
Tourist attractions in Monmouth County, New Jersey
Nightclubs in New Jersey